Jonathan ben Joseph was a Lithuanian rabbi and astronomer who lived in Risenoi, Grodno in the late 17th century and early 18th century. Jonathan studied  astronomy and mathematics.

In 1710 Jonathan and his family lived a year in the fields due to a plague at Risenoi. He vowed that, on surviving, he would spread astronomical knowledge among his fellow believers. After he became blind, he went to Germany, where the bibliographer Wolf met him in 1725. Jonathan authored two astronomical commentaries: the Yeshu'ah be-Yisrael, on Maimonides' neomenia laws (Frankfort-on-the-Main, 1720); and Bi'ur, on Abraham ben Ḥiyya's Ẓurat ha-Areẓ (Offenbach, 1720).

References

17th-century astronomers
18th-century astronomers
Lithuanian astronomers
17th-century births
18th-century deaths
18th-century Lithuanian rabbis
17th-century Lithuanian rabbis
People from Grodno